Pan Am Flight 526A, a Douglas DC-4, took off from San Juan-Isla Grande Airport, Puerto Rico, at 12:11 PM AST on April 11, 1952 on a flight to Idlewild International Airport, New York City with 64 passengers and five crew members on board. Due to inadequate maintenance, engine no. 3 failed after takeoff, followed shortly by engine no. 4.
Nine minutes after takeoff, the aircraft ditched in rough seas 11.3 miles NW of San Juan Airport, broke apart and sank after three minutes. Panicking passengers refused to leave the sinking wreck. 52 passengers were killed, and 17 passengers and crew members were rescued by the USCG. After this accident it was recommended to implement pre-flight safety demonstrations for over-water flights.

Aircraft
The Douglas DC-4 piston aircraft with four propellers had made its first flight in 1945 and had 20,835 airframe hours.

Accident
On a sunny day with a gentle breeze, Pan Am Flight 526A, a Douglas DC-4 named Clipper Endeavor, took off from San Juan Airport at 12:11 PM on Good Friday of 1952 on a flight to Idlewild Airport, NY (now known as JFK). Sixty-four passengers and five crew members were on board, including Captain John C. Burn, a well-qualified, seasoned pilot, in command.

Just after takeoff, engine no. 3 failed at 350 feet and the propeller was feathered (its blades were turned parallel to the direction of flight to avoid drag) by the flight crew. The pilots decided to return to San Juan Airport, reversed their heading, and managed to continue climbing to 550 feet when engine no. 4 failed as well.
With both engines on the right wing inoperable, the Clipper Endeavor was not able to maintain altitude any longer. Captain Burn declared an in-flight emergency and informed the control tower that he planned to attempt a water landing approximately seven miles NNW off Isla Grande.

Fifteen-knot winds whipped up the sea when the Clipper Endeavor ditched into the Atlantic Ocean north of San Juan at 12:20 PM. The rear fuselage broke off behind the bulkhead of the main cabin and the wreckage sank in fewer than three minutes. Survivors later reported that many passengers had survived the initial ditching but had panicked because they feared the rough seas and the possibility of sharks and had refused to leave the sinking aircraft to board life rafts.

Rescue
After having received Captain Burn's emergency transmission, the tower notified the USCG rescue center and a PBY-5A Catalina flying boat under the command of Lieutenant Ted Rapalus was airborne within 6 minutes.
The USCG's second PBY was undergoing routine maintenance and had the auxiliary power unit including bilge pump removed. Due to the gravity of the emergency the PBY was removed from maintenance status and under the command of Lieutenant Commander Ken Bilderback airborne within 10 minutes.
To assist the rescue on the surface, the USCG buoy tender Bramble with medical personnel on board was launched as well. 
Two SA-16 amphibious aircraft from the Ramey AFB located at the far NW corner of Puerto Rico were also dispatched.

Together they were able to rescue twelve passengers and all five crew members from the rough seas.

LCDR Bilderback's PBY had 15 survivors on board when it found itself in a dire situation: because of the missing APU and bilge pump the flying boat had taken on a lot of sea water and almost no power left to takeoff. The decision was made to transfer the survivors to the Bramble. Sea conditions worsened and after the successful transfer of all but two teenage survivors LCDR Bilderbeck's only options were to either abandon the flying boat or to attempt to taxi it back on the sea to San Juan Harbor. As they passed Fort El Morro and taxied into San Juan Harbor, people lined the shore cheering the rescuers.

Probable cause
The following causes were found by the investigation:
 inadequate maintenance: engine no. 3 was not changed, leading to its failure  immediately subsequent to take-off.
 faulty engine parts
 the pilots' attempt to re-establish a climb without using all available power after the loss of the second engine (engine no. 4). This led to a nose high pitch attitude and rapid decrease of airspeed which settled the aircraft at an altitude too low for an effectual recovery.
In subsequent legal proceedings Captain Burn was exonerated and the fault turned out to be inadequate maintenance and faulty parts.

Aftermath
 After this accident it was recommended to brief the passengers about the location and usage of emergency exits and personal flotation devices before flights over open water.
 In memory of the lives lost and honoring the rescuers a San Juan resident wrote a ballad.
 LCDR Bilderback was awarded his second Air Medal. His co-pilot LCDR Jack Natwig received the Silver Lifesaving Medal for jumping into the sea to successfully rescue a young boy. Air Crew members Bill Pinkston, Jim Tierney, Peter Eustes and Raymond Evans were all commended by the Commandant of the USCG for a job well done.
 Pan Am reused the name Clipper Endeavor for both a Boeing 707-321B in 1962 and a Boeing 727-235  in 1980. A Douglas DC-7B was named Clipper Endeavour.

See also

Air-sea rescue
Aviation safety
Ethiopian Airlines Flight 961
List of accidents and incidents involving commercial aircraft
US Airways Flight 1549
Vieques Air Link Flight 901A

References

External links
 Report - Civil Aeronautics Board - PDF
 Accident Description Pan Am Flight 526A, Aviation Safety Net
 Accident Description Pan Am Flight 526A, PanAmAir.org

1952 in Puerto Rico
Aviation accidents and incidents in 1952
Airliner accidents and incidents in Puerto Rico
Airliner accidents and incidents involving ditching
526A
Accidents and incidents involving the Douglas DC-4
April 1952 events in North America
Aviation accidents and incidents in the United States in 1952
Airliner accidents and incidents caused by engine failure